Tina Charles may refer to:

 Tina Charles (singer) (born 1954), English singer
 Tina Charles (basketball) (born 1988), American basketball player

See also
Charles (surname)